"Angels" is a 1984 single by Christian singer Amy Grant, from her album Straight Ahead. Grant performed the song at the 1985 Grammy Awards, where it won her an award for Best Gospel Vocal Performance, Female. It also reached No. 1 on Billboard Hot Christian Songs.

The song begins with an account of the apostle Peter's capture by Herod's guards in the Bible, and goes on to describe how God has His angels watching over believers, to guide and protect them in times of fear, doubt, confusion, or temptation.

Personnel 
 Amy Grant – lead vocals 
 Robbie Buchanan – acoustic piano 
 Michael W. Smith – keyboards, Yamaha GS2
 Shane Keister – synthesizers 
 Jon Goin – guitars 
 Mike Brignardello – bass 
 Paul Leim – drums 
 Deborah Black – backing vocals 
 Bill Champlin – backing vocals 
 Tamara Champlin – backing vocals
 Marty McCall – backing vocals 
 Gary Pigg – backing vocals 
 Carmen Twillie – backing vocals

References

Amy Grant songs
1984 songs
1984 singles
Contemporary Christian songs
Songs written by Brown Bannister
Songs written by Amy Grant
Songs written by Gary Chapman (musician)
Songs written by Michael W. Smith
Myrrh Records singles